Radhavinod Raju ( 27 July 1949 – 21 June 2012) was an Indian Police Service (IPS) officer. He joined the police service in 1975 as Jammu and Kashmir cadre batch. The character Sethurama Iyer, who is the main protagonist of CBI film series in Malayalam films, portrayed by Mammootty is said to have been inspired by Radha Vinod Raj.

Early life and education
Radhavinod Raju was born in Mattancherry, Kochi, Kerala. His father R.S. Raju was a post master in Fort Kochi. He is survived by his wife Achamma and two daughters Sindhoo and Renu. His nephew is Music director/Actor Siddharth Vipin.

He got MSc in Physics from Maharaja's College, Ernakulam, Kerala. He entered into Indian Police Service when he was working as an Officer in Union Bank of India, Goa.

Career
His first appointment as Superintendent of police in Poonch District, Jammu and Kashmir. Then he joined SP in Central Bureau of Investigation (CBI), Ernakulam. After that he served as DIG in Jammu and Kashmir.

On 19 January 2009, he was appointed as the first chief of India's National Investigation Agency. Before that he held the post of Director General of vigilance department of Jammu and Kashmir.

He headed the operational wing of the Special Investigation Team (SIT) which found the killers of Rajiv Gandhi in 1991. His service history also includes important cases like the Kandahar flight hijacking, Purulia arms drop case etc.

He was working as a CBI officer in Kerala in 1983–89. At the time he investigated very important cases in Kerala police history like Polakkulam murder case, Panoor SI Soman murder case, Augustine murder case, Sujatha murder case.

Death
He died in Kochi on 21 June 2012 at the age of 62, due to lung complications. Until his death, he served as an advisory council member of Central Vigilance Commission.

Bibliography
 Triumph of truth:the Rajiv Gandhi assassination, the investigation by D. R. Kaarthikeyan, Radhavinod Raju; Publisher – New Dawn Press, 2004; 
 Rajiv Gandhi Vadham Oru Kuttanweshanam(Malayalam) by D. R. Kaarthikeyan, Radhavinod Raju; Publisher – Olive;

See also
 Rajiv Gandhi
 Assassination of Rajiv Gandhi
 Kandahar flight hijacking
 Purulia arms drop case
 D. R. Karthikeyan

References 

1949 births
2012 deaths
Indian police officers
People from Mattancherry